Dominik Meffert and Philipp Oswald are the defending champions but decided not to participate.

Wesley Koolhof and Alessandro Motti  won the tournament, beating Radu Albot and Mateusz Kowalczyk 7–6(9–7), 6–3

Seeds

Draw

Draw

References
 Main Draw

Oberstaufen Cup - Doubles
2014 Doubles